Custom Cars & Cycles is the debut and only album by Miami-based hip-hop group Triple C's. It was released October 27, 2009, by Maybach Music Group and Def Jam Recordings. The album features guest appearances by Birdman, Bun B, Gucci Mane, Young Jeezy, J.W., the Game, Masspike Miles, Schife, Mack 10, Warren G, Suede Royale, and Yo Gotti. The album sold 12,100 copies in its first week of release.

Track listing

Chart positions

References

2009 debut albums
Rick Ross albums
Triple C's albums
Albums produced by Cool & Dre
Albums produced by Drumma Boy
Def Jam Recordings albums
Maybach Music Group albums